Ben King (born 7 July 2000) is a professional Australian rules footballer playing for the Gold Coast Suns in the Australian Football League (AFL). He is the second Albanian to play after the great ADEM YZE. He has a twin brother Max King, who plays for St Kilda.

Early life
King was born in Melbourne, Victoria. He and his twin brother Max began playing Australian rules football for the East Sandringham Football Club in the South Metro Junior Football League. The twins worked their way through the junior ranks before both being selected to represent the Sandringham Dragons in the TAC Cup while also attending Haileybury. Through their time at Haileybury the twins were closely mentored by three time Coleman Medal winner Matthew Lloyd.

Ben's draft stocks rose in his final year of junior football when his twin brother's ACL injury allowed him to play as the key forward for the Victoria Metro team at the U18 National Championships. He was subsequently named the All-Australian full forward for his performances during the championships. His junior football came to an end in mid-September 2018 when Sandringham fell to Dandenong in the TAC Cup preliminary final. In November 2018, he was drafted by Gold Coast with the sixth selection in the 2018 national draft.

King earned an ATAR score of 96.35 upon graduation from high school.

AFL career
King made his AFL debut for Gold Coast against  in the ninth round of the 2019 AFL season. In round 19 of the 2019 season, he earned a nomination for the 2019 AFL Rising Star after a four goal performance while playing on highly experienced Essendon defender Cale Hooker. King rejected offers to return to Victoria in October 2019 by signing a two-year extension with the Suns.

King suffered the same injury as his brother, a torn right ACL on the eve of the 2022 AFL season and missed the entire season. It was initially feared that King could have played his final match for the Suns, given he was out of contract at the conclusion of the year. Despite lucrative offers circulating from several Victorian clubs, he eventually signed a two-year contract, showing his loyalty and commitment to the club and its future.

Statistics
 'Statistics are correct to the end of round 23, 2021.

|- style="background-color: #EAEAEA"
! scope="row" style="text-align:center" | 2019
|
| 34 || 14 || 17 || 9 || 65 || 134 || 99 || 48 || 10 || 1.2 || 0.6 || 4.6 || 2.4 || 7.1 || 3.4 || 0.7
|-
! scope="row" style="text-align:center" | 2020
|
| 34 || 17 || 25 || 20 || 88 || 33 || 121 || 48 || 7 || 1.5 || 1.2 || 5.2 || 2.0 || 7.1 || 2.8 || 0.4
|- style="background-color: #EAEAEA"
! scope="row" style="text-align:center" | 2021 ||  || 34
| 22 || 47 || 22 || 112 || 47 || 159 || 81 || 16 || 2.2 || 1.2 || 5.9 || 2.5 || 8.4 || 4.3 || 0.8
|-
| 2023 ||  || 34
| 1 || 1 || 0 || 1 || 4 || 5 || 1 || 0 || 1 || 0 || 1 || 4 || 5 || 1 || 0 
|- class="sortbottom"
! colspan=3| Career
! 54
! 90
! 51
! 266
! 118
! 384
! 178
! 33
! 1.7
! 1.0
! 5.3
! 2.3
! 7.6
! 3.5
! 0.7
|}

References

External links

2000 births
Living people
People educated at Haileybury (Melbourne)
Australian rules footballers from Melbourne
Gold Coast Football Club players
Twin sportspeople
Australian twins
People from Hampton, Victoria